Hans-Jürgen Mende (19 May 1945 in Berlin-Kreuzberg – 21 September 2018 in Rostock) was a German historian. He was a lecturer in the history of philosophy at the Weißensee Academy of Art Berlin. After the reunification of Germany (1989/90) he became founder and managing director of the social and cultural-historical association , whose main aim was the research and spreading of the history of Berlin and Brandenburg.

Mende died in Berlin at the age of 73.

Publications 
 (ed.): Lexikon ‚Alle Berliner Straßen und Plätze‘ – Von der Gründung bis zur Gegenwart. Neues Leben / Edition Luisenstadt, Berlin 1998,  (4 volumes, 2300 pages).
 with Kurt Wernicke (ed.): Reihe Berliner Bezirkslexikon:
 Kathrin Chod, Herbert Schwenk, Hainer Weißpflug: Berliner Bezirkslexikon Mitte. 2 volumes. FTS Berlin / Edition Luisenstadt, 2001, .
 Kathrin Chod, Herbert Schwenk, Hainer Weißpflug: Berliner Bezirkslexikon Friedrichshain-Kreuzberg. 2 volumes. FTS Berlin / Edition Luisenstadt, 2002, .
 Kathrin Chod, Herbert Schwenk, Hainer Weißpflug: Berliner Bezirkslexikon Friedrichshain-Kreuzberg.  / Edition Luisenstadt, Berlin 2003, .
 Hainer Weißpflug et al.: Berliner Bezirkslexikon Charlottenburg-Wilmersdorf. Haude und Spener / Edition Luisenstadt, Berlin 2005, .
 Hainer Weißpflug et al.: Berliner Bezirkslexikon Treptow-Köpenick. FTS Berlin / Edition Luisenstadt, 2009, .
 Hans-Jürgen Mende (ed.): Reihe Berliner Friedhofsführer. 2002–2015, 23rd issue.
 with Sylvia Lais (ed.): Lexikon Berliner Straßennamen. Haude und Spener, Berlin 2003, .
 Lexikon Berliner Begräbnisstätten. Pharus-Plan, Berlin 2018, .
Der Jüdische Friedhof in Berlin-Weißensee. Pharus Verlag, Berlin 2016, .

References

External links 
 
 
 Dr. Hans-Jürgen Mende, Luisenstädtischer Bildungsverein.

1945 births
2018 deaths
Writers from Berlin
German historians of philosophy
Academic staff of the Weißensee Academy of Art Berlin
German editors